Soul for Sale is the second album by Finnish band Soulcage, released in 2009. My Canvas, My Skin  was released as the lead single along with a video directed and written by Tuomas Parviainen, reaching number 8 on the official Finnish download chart and number 10 on the Finnish single chart in March 2009.

The album was released in the United Kingdom on April 23, 2010.

Track listing
 "Flaming Flowers (Send in The Clowns)" - 03:10
 "I See" - 03:01
 "My Canvas, My Skin" - 03:18
 "Ride On" - 02:54
 "Until You Find Me" - 04:16
 "Satellite Children" - 03:33
 "Bleeding" - 03:11
 "Origin" - 04:04
 "Stranger in You" - 03:02
 "You Get So Alone" - 03:36
 "MIA" - 05:29

References

2006 albums
Soulcage albums